Berks, Bucks and Oxon Division 2 is an English rugby union league featuring teams from Berkshire, Buckinghamshire and Oxfordshire. As with all of the divisions in this area at this level, the entire league is made up of second and third teams of clubs whose first teams play at a higher level of the rugby union pyramid. Promoted teams move up to Berks/Bucks & Oxon 1 while relegated teams drop to Berks/Bucks & Oxon 3.

The division was created in 2004-05 as part of a complete overhaul of the Berks/Bucks & Oxon league, with a large number of 2nd, 3rd and 4th teams entering at various levels, and was divided into north and south regions, becoming the third division of the league structure with promoted teams going into Berks/Bucks & Oxon 1 and there being no relegation. Further league restructuring in 2011 saw Berks/Bucks & Oxon 2 become one league instead of two regional divisions and newly created divisions below it meant that relegation was introduced. Changes above the division meant that 1st teams were split from 2nd, 3rd and 4th teams and Berks/Bucks & Oxon 1 was the furthest teams in Berks/Bucks & Oxon 2 and below could go in the system.

Participating Clubs 2016-17
Beaconsfield II
Buckingham II
Henley III
High Wycombe II
Marlow II
Newbury II
Oxford Harlequins II
Redingensians IV
Windsor III
Witney III

Participating Clubs 2012–13

Alchester II
Aylesbury II
Bicester II
Bletchley II
Buckingham II
Oxford Harlequins II
Reading Abbey II
Tadley II
Wallingford II
Witney III

Berks/Bucks & Oxon 2 North Honours

Berks/Bucks & Oxon 2 South Honours

Berks/Bucks & Oxon 2 Honours

See also
 Berkshire RFU
 Buckinghamshire RFU
 Oxfordshire RFU
 English rugby union system
 Rugby union in England

References

Rugby union leagues in the English Midlands
Rugby union in Buckinghamshire
Rugby union in Oxfordshire
Rugby union in Berkshire